Keith Frederick Chater FRS (born 23 April 1944) is a British microbiologist, and John Innes Foundation Emeritus Fellow, at John Innes Centre.
He is a member of Faculty of 1000.
He is honorary professor at University of East Anglia.

Career
Chater studied for a PhD at the University of Birmingham working on transduction in Salmonella.

Career and research
He joined the John Innes Centre in 1969 and began working with David Hopwood. His group developed the ΦC31 bacteriophage into a series of cloning vectors that are used to isolate genes in Streptomyces.

References

1944 births
Living people
Alumni of the University of Birmingham
Academics of the University of East Anglia
Fellows of the Royal Society
British microbiologists